Nikolai Muscat (born 13 July 1996) is a Maltese footballer who plays as a midfielder for Gżira United F.C. and the Malta national team.

Career
Muscat made his international debut for Malta on 18 November 2019 in a UEFA Euro 2020 qualifying match against Norway, which finished as a 1–2 home loss.

Career statistics

International

References

External links
 
 
 

1996 births
Living people
Maltese footballers
Malta youth international footballers
Malta under-21 international footballers
Malta international footballers
Association football midfielders
San Gwann F.C. players
Gżira United F.C. players
Maltese Premier League players